Merlon Mountain is a mountain in the Waddington Range of southwestern British Columbia, Canada.

See also
 List of mountains of Canada

References

Pacific Ranges
Two-thousanders of British Columbia
Range 2 Coast Land District